Jaanbaaz Hindustan Ke is Hindi action thriller series starring Regina Cassandra, Barun Sobti, Sumeet Vyas, Mita Vashisht and Chandan Roy. It is produced by Juggernaut Productions and directed by National Film Awards winner Srijit Mukherji.

Plot 
An edge-of-the-seat thriller, the story revolves around an IPS officer and single mother Kavya Iyer braving odds as she leads an investigation in an ISIS-K bomb attack case.

Cast 
 Regina Cassandra - Kavya Iyer IPS
 Barun Sobti - Sameer Gupta IAS
 Sumeet Vyas - Tariq
 Mita Vashisht - Mahira Rizvi, NIA Chief.
 Chandan Roy - Chandan Jha
 Gayathrie - Thasleena
 Manish Chaudhary - Abbas Rizvi
 Deepika Amin - Sumithra Iyer, Kavya's Mother
 Jihan Hodar - Reyansh
 Anup Hazarika - Jason Wahlang
 Chien Ho Liao - Rupnath

Production 
Jaanbaaz Hindustan Ke went on floors in September 2022 in Meghalaya. The show has been shot across Meghalaya, Maharashtra, Kerala and Rajasthan.

Marketing 
The teaser promo of Jaanbaaz Hindustan Ke was released on 3 January 2023. As a part of the promotions, Regina Cassandra met with police officers in Delhi's Connaught Place police station along with ex-cop Kiran Bedi to felicitate officers for their work.

Reception 
The show received mixed reviews. Koimoi.com rated it 3 out of 5 stars and commented, "Srijit Mukherji's gaze toward women is empowering and empathetic at the same time." Writing for Rediff.com, Deepa Gahlot commented, "The show is an earnest but mostly dull police procedural that shows in great detail how the cops find clues, chase suspects and protect the country."

References

External links 
 

Thriller web series
Indian web series
ZEE5 original programming